These are the results of the men's K-1 1000 metres competition in canoeing at the 1948 Summer Olympics.  The K-1 event is raced by single-man canoe sprint kayaks. Heat and semifinals took place on August 12.

Medalists

Heats
The 15 competitors first raced in two heats.  The top four finishers in both heats moved directly to the final.

Final

In the heats, Fredriksson was fourth with 50 meters left and sprinted to the win. Fredriksson's margin of victory is the largest in any Olympic kayak final that was not 10,000 meters in length.

References

1948 Summer Olympics official report. p. 314.
Sports-reference.com 1948 K-1 1000 m results.
Wallechinsky, David, and Jaime Loucky (2008). "Canoeing: Men's Kayak Singles 1000 Meters". In The Complete Book of the Olympics: 2008 Edition. London: Aurum Press, Limited. p. 471.

Men's K-1 1000
Men's events at the 1948 Summer Olympics